Stil FM 105.5 FM is a radio station in Călăraşi, Romania. 
The Stil FM radio program includes Pro FM network shows - Morning, Evening and Weekend shows.

Stil FM broadcasts in two cities:*
Călăraşi – 105.5 FM
Oltenița – 88.2 FM
*See map of broadcast areas on the Stil FM website.

References

External links

Radio stations in Romania – Romanian Ministry of Communications and Information Technology (Romanian)
Romanian Ministry of Communications and Information Technology (Romanian & English)
Company listing on Westbiz website

Radio stations in Romania
Romanian-language radio stations
Mass media in Călărași